The 1992 United States presidential election in Connecticut took place on November 3, 1992, as part of the 1992 United States presidential election. Voters chose eight representatives, or electors to the Electoral College, who voted for president and vice president.

Connecticut was won by Governor Bill Clinton (D-Arkansas) with 42.21% of the popular vote over incumbent President George H. W. Bush (R-Texas) with 35.78%. Businessman Ross Perot (I-Texas) finished in third, with 21.58% of the popular vote. Clinton won Connecticut by a margin of 6.43%, marking the first time the state voted for a Democratic presidential nominee since 1968. It would be the last time Connecticut was regarded as a swing state, as it has voted Democratic by double digits in every election since. Clinton ultimately won the national vote, defeating incumbent President Bush. , this is the last election in which Fairfield County voted for the Republican candidate. This is also the most recent occasion that Connecticut voted to the right of the following states: Arkansas, Michigan, Minnesota, Missouri, New Mexico, Oregon, Pennsylvania, and West Virginia.

As of 2020, this was the most recent presidential election in which the Republican nominee carried the city of Danbury and the towns of Fairfield, Milford, North Canaan, Old Saybrook, Pomfret, Stratford, and Weston. This was also the first time since 1912 that the towns of Washington and Canaan voted Democratic. This is also the only time since 1889 that a Democrat won the presidency without winning the city of Derby.

Results

By county

See also
 United States presidential elections in Connecticut

Notes

References

Connecticut
1992
1992 Connecticut elections